Sreepur Upazila may refer to:
Sreepur Upazila, Gazipur, Bangladesh
Sreepur Upazila, Magura, Bangladesh